Eagles Postgame Live airs after each Philadelphia Eagles game on NBC Sports Philadelphia. The program features the team's post game press conference, interviews, and game analysis.  A featured analyst is former Pennsylvania Governor and former Philadelphia City Mayor, Ed Rendell.

Personalities

Host 
 Michael Barkann

Analysts 
 Barrett Brooks
 Ron Jaworski
 Reuben Frank
 Seth Joyner (2013–2021)
 Ed Rendell, Former Pennsylvania Governor and former Mayor of Philadelphia (1997–2019)
 Ray Didinger (1997–2021)
 Brian Westbrook (2013–2016)
 Tra Thomas (2011–2012)
 Vaughn Hebron (1998–2010)
 Ike Reese (2012–2013)
 Leonard Weaver (2012–2013)

Reporters 
 John Clark
 Derrick Gunn (1997–2020)
 Kathy Romano
 Meredith Marakovits (2011)

References

External links
Postgame Live Homepage
Comcast SportsNet Philadelphia

Comcast SportsNet original programming
Local sports television programming in the United States